Graham William Walker (born 4 April 1963), better known by his stage name Graham Norton, is an Irish comedian, actor, author, and television host. Well known for his work in the UK, he is a five-time BAFTA TV Award winner for his comedy chat show The Graham Norton Show (2007–present) and an eight-time award-winner overall—he received the British Academy Television Award for Best Entertainment Performance three times for So Graham Norton (2000 to 2002). Originally shown on BBC Two before moving to other slots on BBC One, his chat show succeeded Friday Night with Jonathan Ross in BBC One's prestigious late-Friday-evening slot in 2010.

From 2010 to 2020, Norton presented the Saturday-morning slot on BBC Radio 2. In 2021, he began presenting on Saturdays and Sundays on Virgin Radio UK. Since 2009, he has served as the BBC's television commentator for the Eurovision Song Contest, which led Hot Press to describe him as "the 21st century's answer to Terry Wogan". He has been noted for his innuendo-laden dialogue and flamboyant presentation style. Prior to establishing himself as a presenter, Norton appeared as Father Noel Furlong in three episodes of the multiple award-winning Channel 4 sitcom Father Ted. In 2012, he sold his production company So Television to ITV for around £17 million. In 2019, he became a judge on RuPaul's Drag Race UK.

Early life
Norton was born Graham William Walker on 4 April 1963 at 48, St Brigid's Road, in Clondalkin, County Dublin, Ireland to William "Billy" (died 2000), a sales representative for Guinness, and Rhoda Walker. He has an older sister, Paula. He grew up in a Protestant (Church of Ireland) family in the town of Bandon, County Cork, which he has said made him feel somewhat isolated. His father's family were from County Wicklow, while his mother is a native of Belfast. He discovered during a 2007 episode of the genealogy series Who Do You Think You Are? that his father's direct ancestors were English, having originated in Yorkshire before emigrating to Ireland in 1713. 

Norton was educated at Bandon Grammar School in County Cork and then University College Cork, where he spent two years studying English and French in the 1980s, but did not complete his studies after having a breakdown and refusing to leave his flat. He later received an honorary doctorate from the university in 2013. In the late 1980s, he moved to London to attend the Central School of Speech and Drama. He also worked as a waiter during that time. Upon joining the actors' union Equity, he chose Norton (his great-grandmother's maiden name) as his new surname as there was already an actor called Graham Walker represented by the union.

Career

Channel 4
In 1992, Norton's stand-up comedy drag act as a tea-towel-clad Mother Teresa of Calcutta in the Edinburgh Festival Fringe made the press when Scottish Television's religious affairs department mistakenly thought he represented the real Mother Teresa. His first appearances in broadcasting were in the UK, where he had a spot as a regular comedian and panellist on the BBC Radio 4 show Loose Ends in the early 1990s, when the show ran on Saturday mornings. He was one of the early successes of Channel 5, winning an award as stand-in host of a late-night TV talk show usually presented by Jack Docherty. This was followed by a comic quiz show on Channel 5 called Bring Me the Head of Light Entertainment, which was not well received as a programme but enhanced Norton's reputation as a comic and host. In 1996, he co-hosted the late-night quiz show Carnal Knowledge on ITV with Maria McErlane.

In 1996, Norton played the part of Father Noel Furlong in three episodes ("Hell", "Flight into Terror", "The Mainland") of the Channel 4 series Father Ted, which was set on the fictional Craggy Island off the west coast of Ireland. Father Furlong was often seen taking charge of the St Luke's Youth Group.

After this early success, Norton moved to Channel 4 in 1998 to host his own chat shows, including the weekly So Graham Norton (1998–2002), followed by the daily weeknight show V Graham Norton (2002–03). As a performer who is not only openly gay, but also camp and flamboyant, it was here that Norton's act was fully honed as a cheeky, innuendo-laden joker.

In 2003, he was the subject of controversy in the United Kingdom when, on his show on Channel 4, he made a comedic reference to the recent death of Bee Gees singer Maurice Gibb. The Independent Television Commission (I.T.C.) investigated after complaints about this insensitivity were received and eventually Channel 4 had to make two apologies: one in the form of a caption slide before the show, another from Norton in person.

Also in 2003, Norton was listed in The Observer as one of the 1,000 funniest acts in British comedy. (Though Norton is Irish, the bulk of his television career has been in the UK.) In January 2004, he was named the most powerful person in TV comedy by Radio Times.

In the summer of 2004, Norton ventured into American television. The Graham Norton Effect debuted on 24 June 2004 on Comedy Central, and was also broadcast in the UK on BBC Three. In the midst of controversy surrounding Justin Timberlake and Janet Jackson's Super Bowl performance, Norton was wary of moving into the market.

BBC

Television

Norton began his career on the BBC in 2001 when he hosted Comic Relief 2001.

In 2005, Norton moved to the BBC and began hosting the Saturday evening reality TV series Strictly Dance Fever on BBC One, as well as a new comedy chat show, Graham Norton's Bigger Picture. He also read stories some nights on the BBC children's channel CBeebies as part of Bedtime Hour.

In 2006, Norton hosted the BBC One series How Do You Solve a Problem like Maria? in which Andrew Lloyd Webber tried to find a lead actress for his West End version of The Sound of Music. Norton has subsequently presented the three follow-up series: Any Dream Will Do in 2007, in which a group of males competed to win the role of Joseph in the West End production of Joseph and the Amazing Technicolor Dreamcoat; I'd Do Anything in 2008, in which Lloyd Webber seeks to find the parts of Nancy and Oliver for Sir Cameron Mackintosh's production of Lionel Bart's Oliver!; and Over the Rainbow in 2010, following a similar format to find a new Dorothy for a Wizard of Oz West end Production.

Norton hosted various other shows for the BBC during this time, including When Will I Be Famous? (2007),  The One and Only (2008) and Totally Saturday (2009). Since 2007, Norton has also been a regular host of The British Academy Television Awards. On 7 July 2007, Norton presented at Live Earth and undertook a trip to Ethiopia with the Born Free Foundation to highlight the plight of the Ethiopian wolf – the rarest canid in the world. In the same year, he was the subject of an episode of the BBC1 genealogy documentary Who Do You Think You Are?

Norton's chat show, The Graham Norton Show, began on 22 February 2007 on BBC Two. The format is very similar to his previous Channel 4 shows. On 6 October 2009, the show moved to BBC One, in a new one-hour format.

In May 2010, he stood in for Chris Evans' breakfast show on BBC Radio 2. Later that month, it was confirmed that he would be replacing Jonathan Ross's Saturday morning slot on the same station.

In December 2011, the panel show Would You Rather...? with Graham Norton premiered on BBC America in the time slot immediately following The Graham Norton Show. Recorded in New York, it is one of BBC America's earliest efforts at producing original programming, and is also the first panel game the channel has shown, either of British or American origin.

In October 2018, talking to BBC News about his reported 2017–18 BBC salary, Norton said that he genuinely "doesn't know" how the corporation arrived at that figure.  "Myself and my agent look at that number and we go 'I wonder how they came up with that'," he says.  "It bears no relation to anything I know. But if that's what they say I earn, that's what I earn."

In February 2019, it was announced that Norton would be a judge on RuPaul's Drag Race UK alongside Alan Carr in a rotating basis. Norton and Carr were joined by permanent judges Michelle Visage and RuPaul.

Radio
Since 1999 Graham Norton has appeared regularly on the BBC Radio 4 panel show Just a Minute, appearing in over 100 episodes.

On 2 October 2010, Norton began presenting a Saturday morning show on BBC Radio 2, which he took over from Jonathan Ross. Norton co-hosted with Maria McErlane who featured as an "agony aunt" on the segment "Grill Graham". "Tune with a Tale" is where a listener suggests playing a song with a plot, summarising the story it contains, and "I Can't Believe It's Not Better" is a feature where a listener requests a song that was previously a hit, but might be considered particularly bad now. Unlike Steve Wright in the Afternoon aired from 14:00 to 17:00 on weekdays, it is well established as being a "brand", with its end of each hour style of presentations, although Norton regularly uses the standard BBC Radio 2 jingles along with jingles unique to the Saturday morning show, written and performed by the BBC Radio 2 Orchestra.

In January 2012, Norton asked listeners to his Radio 2 show to help find his car, shortly after it was stolen.  He called it "The Great Car Hunt" and told listeners to
"Keep your eyes out for it. It was filthy by the way."

On 11 November 2020, Norton announced that he would step down from the show and hosted his final Saturday morning show on 19 December 2020 after 10 years. He was replaced by Claudia Winkleman from February 2021.

Norton confirmed in November 2020 that he would join Virgin Radio UK in 2021 to host shows on Saturday and Sunday.

Eurovision Song Contest

Norton, along with Claudia Winkleman, hosted the first annual Eurovision Dance Contest, which was held on 1 September 2007 in London, England. The format was based on the BBC's Strictly Come Dancing and the EBU's Eurovision Song Contest. Norton and Winkleman also hosted the 2008 contest in Glasgow, Scotland.

In October 2008, it was confirmed by the BBC that Norton would replace Terry Wogan as the presenter of the UK national selection of the Eurovision Song Contest, Your Country Needs You.

On 5 December 2008, it was announced that Norton would also take over from Wogan as the British commentator for the main Eurovision Song Contest. The 54th Eurovision Song Contest was held in the Olympic Arena, Moscow on 16 May 2009.

Norton's debut jokes received some positive reviews from the British press. The Guardian noted his comments on Iceland's entry, which finished in second place, had "rooted around in a cupboard and found an old bridesmaid dress from 1987" and the Armenian singers, who finished in 10th place, were sporting traditional dress, "which would be true if you come from the village where Liberace is the mayor." The Times noted his highlighting of the arrest of 30 gay rights protesters in Moscow – "heavy-handed policing has really marred what has been a fantastic Eurovision."

In 2015, Norton, along with Petra Mede, hosted the Eurovision Song Contest's Greatest Hits concert show on 31 March at the Eventim Apollo, in Hammersmith, London to commemorate the contest's 60th anniversary.

Norton played a fictionalized version of himself in his role of the British Eurovision commentator in the 2020 Netflix film Eurovision Song Contest: The Story of Fire Saga. He will be the second oldest host of the Eurovision Song Contest after the French presenter Léon Zitrone in 1978.

Other

Norton played Mr Puckov in the 2006 American comedy spoof film Another Gay Movie. In 2007, Norton played Taylor in the romantic comedy film, I Could Never Be Your Woman.

Norton was involved in a high-publicity advertising campaign for the UK National Lottery as an animated unicorn, the stooge to a character based on Lady Luck (played by Fay Ripley). He has also advertised McVitie's biscuits.

In 2007, Norton featured in Girls Aloud and Sugababes' Comic Relief video for the single "Walk This Way"

In January 2009, Norton made his West End stage debut in a revival of La Cage Aux Folles at the Playhouse Theatre. In 2009, Norton was the host of the comedy game-show Most Popular on US cable television channel WE tv.

Norton wrote an advice column in The Daily Telegraph newspaper from 2006 to 2018. In October 2010, his columns were made into a book entitled Ask Graham, published by John Blake Publishing. In late 2018, Norton stood down from the role and the newspaper found a replacement as their agony aunt in Richard Madeley.

In 2016, Norton published his debut novel Holding, published by Hodder & Stoughton, about a murder in an Irish rural community. Norton won Popular Fiction Book of the Year award for Holding in the Bord Gais Energy Irish Book Awards 2016. In 2022, an adaptation of the book, directed by Kathy Burke, aired on ITV.

On 7 March 2013, Norton broke the Guinness World Record for "Most Questions Asked on a TV Chat Show" on Comic Relief's Big Chat, which raised £1.02 million.

In 2014, Norton criticised the decision by Irish broadcaster RTÉ to settle out of court with opponents of gay marriage who claimed they had been defamed in an edition of the Saturday Night Show.

In 2014, Norton publicly backed "Hacked Off" and its campaign toward UK press self-regulation by "safeguarding the press from political interference while also giving vital protection to the vulnerable".

In October 2014, Norton released his second memoir, The Life and Loves of a He-Devil. It won in the Non-Fiction Book of the Year category at the 2014 Irish Book Awards. Also in 2014, he was named in the top 10 on the World Pride Power list.

Norton has a shareholding of two per cent in New Zealand winery Invivo Wines. Norton has his own wine range in collaboration with Invivo, the first wine was first released in 2014.

In July 2015, the Bishop of Cork, Paul Colton, hosted an evening with Norton involving 90 minutes of interview, questions, and answers with an audience of more than 400 people. The event, part of the West Cork Literary Festival, was sold out.

On 9 October 2020, Norton announced via Twitter he had been cast as the voice of Moonwind, a spiritual sign twirler, in the Disney/Pixar animated feature Soul, starring Jamie Foxx and Tina Fey.

Personal life
In 1989, Norton was mugged, beaten up, and stabbed by a group of attackers in London. He lost half of his blood and nearly died. He said that an elderly couple were the ones who found him and that they "saved his life" after calling for an ambulance. He did not think the attack was homophobic, as he was walking alone at the time. He was hospitalised for two-and-a-half weeks before eventually recovering from the attack.

In January 2012, Norton's home was burgled. The keys to his Lexus were stolen during the burglary. He appealed for the return of his car during his BBC Radio 2 show the following day.

Norton primarily resides in the Wapping area of London. He also owns an apartment in New York City and a holiday home in Ahakista, County Cork. He had two dogs, a labradoodle called Bailey and a terrier called Madge, which he adopted from the UK charity Dogs Trust in 2012. In September 2020, he said that Madge had died in December 2019, and said in October 2020 that Bailey had recently died in Cork at the age of 15.

Norton is gay. He dated Kristian Seeber, who performs as the drag queen Tina Burner. He split up from his partner of two years, Trevor Patterson, in 2013, and broke up with his subsequent partner, Andrew Smith, in 2015. He said in 2015 that his ex-boyfriends often resented the role they had to play in the public eye as his partner.

On 10 July 2022, Norton held a wedding blessing party, with his new husband Jonathan McLeod, at Bantry House in County Cork.

In October 2022, Norton deactivated his Twitter account following criticism from J. K. Rowling and supporters after he had replied to an interview question on transgender rights that it would be better to "talk to trans people, talk to the parents of trans kids, talk to doctors" than to celebrities like himself.

Filmography

Television

Films

Stand-up videos
 Live at the Roundhouse (19 November 2001)

Bibliography
Autobiography
 
 

General non-fiction
 

Fiction
 
  – American edition

Accolades

See also
 List of celebrities who own wineries and vineyards

References

External links

 The Graham Norton Show (BBC One)
 The Graham Norton Radio Show with Waitrose on Virgin Radio UK (Virgin Radio UK)
 
 
 

 
1963 births
20th-century Irish comedians
20th-century Irish LGBT people
21st-century Irish comedians
21st-century Irish LGBT people
Alumni of the Royal Central School of Speech and Drama
Alumni of University College Cork
Audiobook narrators
BBC Radio 2 presenters
Best Entertainment Performance BAFTA Award (television) winners
Eurovision commentators
Gay comedians
Irish Anglicans
Irish columnists
Irish expatriates in the United Kingdom
Irish gay actors
Irish gay writers
Irish male comedians
Irish male film actors
Irish male novelists
Irish male television actors
Irish male voice actors
Irish memoirists
Irish people of English descent
Irish television talk show hosts
Irish LGBT broadcasters
LGBT DJs
Irish LGBT comedians
Living people
People associated with University College Cork
People educated at Bandon Grammar School
People from Bandon, County Cork
People from Clondalkin
RuPaul's Drag Race UK
Stabbing survivors
Television presenters from the Republic of Ireland
Virgin Radio (UK)
Irish LGBT journalists